The Richmond River is a river of Saint Vincent and the Grenadines.

See also
List of rivers of Saint Vincent and the Grenadines

References
 GEOnet Names Server
Tourist Map
Environmental Investigation and Cataloguing, St. Vincent Cross Country Road Project Final Report

Rivers of Saint Vincent and the Grenadines